The UCL School of Slavonic and East European Studies (SSEES ) is a school of University College London (UCL) specializing in Central, Eastern and South-Eastern Europe, Russia and Eurasia. It teaches a range of subjects, including the history, politics, literature, sociology, economics and languages of the region. It is Britain's largest centre for study of Central, Eastern and South-Eastern Europe and Russia. It has links with universities across Europe and beyond. It became part of UCL in 1999.

History
The school was founded by Robert Seton-Watson in 1915, as a department of Columbia University, and inaugurated by Tomáš Garrigue Masaryk, later President of Czechoslovakia. In 1932 it became an independent institute of the University of London, but it merged with University College London in 1999.

Teaching
More than 60 staff teach and conduct research in the history, economics, politics, sociology, anthropology, culture, literature and languages of the countries of Central, Eastern and South-Eastern Europe, and Russia. In 2012/2013 the school had over 200 graduate students studying taught MA degrees or undertaking PhD research. The school also has over 600 undergraduate students.

Research
Along with its undergraduate and graduate teaching, the school hosts several interdisciplinary research centres, groups and funded projects aimed at helping to expand research and understanding of its specialist regions.

It is a major centre for training the next generation of regional specialists, through a combination of academic rigour and the skills and knowledge required by employers. It analyses and disseminates information about changes in the region, publishing periodicals, papers and books, holding conferences, public lectures, seminars and briefings, and providing experts to act as advisers to governments, the media and institutions.

Library
The library of some 357,000 volumes of books, pamphlets and periodicals is unique in the United Kingdom for the quantity of research material on open access and the extensive collection of regional newspapers. Its collections are consulted by scholars from all over the world. It has recently taken on a major role in providing electronic and audio-visual material on its area of study. The library moved from Senate House to a new building in Taviton Street in 2005.

The main fields of interest are the languages, literature, history, politics, economics, geography and bibliography of the countries it covers. Subsidiary fields are the arts in general, demography, ethnography and religion. Material is also collected on the former German Democratic Republic (history, political and economic life), the history of Germany and Austria, the Lusatian Sorbs, and Slavonic and Ugro-Finnic studies in general. It houses the Bain Graffy Film Collection of films from and about Russia and Central and Eastern Europe.

Building
In May 2004 the foundation stone of the school's new building on Taviton Street, Bloomsbury, was unveiled by the President of Poland, Aleksander Kwaśniewski, in the presence of The Princess Royal, Chancellor of the University of London. The school moved to the building in the summer of 2005 after almost 90 years at Senate House. Václav Klaus, President of the Czech Republic, delivered the keynote address of his visit to the UK at a ceremony to open the building in October 2005. After Klaus's address, the Princess Royal unveiled a stone to mark the formal opening, on the occasion of the school's 90th anniversary.

The building was designed by the architects Short and Associates. The design aims to be "environmentally friendly" not simply with solar panels, but by facilitating the draught of cool air round the building, to avoid a need for air conditioning or other energy-using solutions – a first for the "central London heat island".

Notable alumni and staff

Acija Alfirević, academic and writer
Anthony Bailey (BA Eastern and Central European Studies, 1991), interfaith campaigner 
Robin Baker (BA), former Vice-Chancellor of Canterbury Christ Church University
George Bolsover (Director of SSEES, 1947–1976)
Michael Branch (BA; PhD, 1967; Director of SSEES, 1980–2001)
Jamie Bulloch (MA, Central and East European History, 1993; PhD, 2002), literary translator
Sir Roger Carrick (Bulgarian, 1962), diplomat and former UK High Commissioner to Australia
Robert Conquest (Bulgarian, 1943), historian and poet
Norman Davies (lecturer then Professor of History, 1971–1996)
Peter J. S. Duncan (Honorary Associate Professor of Russian Politics)
Robert Fico (Masaryk scholarship), former Prime Minister of Slovakia
Robert I. Frost (PhD History), historian
Julian Graffy (Emeritus Professor of Russian Literature and Cinema, and founder of SSEES's Bain-Graffy Film Collection)
Titus Hjelm (lecturer in Finnish Studies), member of the power metal band Thunderstone
Sir Robert Hodgson (Chair of SSEES Council, 1943–1945), diplomat
Clare Hollingworth (Croatian), journalist
Geoffrey Hosking (Chair and Leverhulme Research Professor of Russian History, 1984–2007), academic and co-founder of Nightline
Lindsey Hughes (Reader then Professor of Russian History, 1987–2007)
Andres Kasekamp (PhD History, 1996), Director of the Estonian Foreign Policy Institute and Professor of Baltic Politics at the University of Tartu
David Kirby (former Professor of Modern European History), historian of the Baltic states
Ivo Lapenna (Reader in Soviet Law, c. 1964 onwards), former President of the World Esperanto Association and academic lawyer
Alena Ledeneva (current Professor of Politics and Society)
Stephen Lovell (MA, PhD), academic
Clarence Manning (staff), academic and Slavicist
Tomáš Garrigue Masaryk (Inaugurated SSEES, Professor of Slavic Research), first President of Czechoslovakia
Margaret Stevenson Miller (PhD), academic and women's rights campaigner
Roger Moorhouse (MA History and Politics, 1994), author and historian
Atukwei Okai (MPhil, 1971), Ghanaian poet, cultural activist and academic
Sir Bernard Pares (first Director of SSEES, Professor of Russian Language, Literature and History, 1919-1939)
László Péter (lecturer then Chair of Hungarian history, 1963–1994)
Martyn Rady (current Masaryk Professor of Central European History)
Sir John Randall (BA Serbo-Croatian language and literature, 1979), former Deputy Chief Whip of the House of Commons
Anna Reid (History), historian, journalist and author
Jacek Rostowski (BSc, MA, 1973, then lecturer, 1988–95) former Minister of Finance and Deputy Prime Minister of Poland
Jonathan Ross (Modern European History), UK TV presenter
Andrew Rothstein (lecturer in Russian and Soviet History, 1946–1950), journalist and founding member of the Communist Party of Great Britain
Mike Sarne (BA), actor, film director and singer of the 1962 UK number one song, "Come Outside"
Edward Schofield, curator at the British Museum and British Library
György Schöpflin (former Jean Monnet Professor of Politics), Hungarian Member of the European Parliament
Robert Service (former lecturer in Russian History), historian and author
Hugh Seton-Watson (Chair of Russian History, 1951–1983)
R. W. Seton-Watson (founder of SSEES, Masaryk Professor of Central European History, 1922–45), political activist and historian
Robin Shepherd, political commentator
Nick Taussig (MA in Russian Literature), author and film producer
Trevor Thomas (former lecturer in Czech and Slovak History)
Mihai Răzvan Ungureanu (former teaching fellow), former Prime Minister of Romania and 
Doreen Warriner (development economist)

References

External links

Official site

 
1915 establishments in England
Educational institutions established in 1915
Former colleges of the University of London